Julia Wong (born 16 May 1995) is a Norwegian politician for the Labour Party.

She served as a deputy representative to the Parliament of Norway from Rogaland during the term 2017–2021. Of Chinese descent, she hails from Sandnes and has been a member of the city council.

References

1995 births
Living people
Norwegian people of Chinese descent
People from Sandnes
Deputy members of the Storting
Labour Party (Norway) politicians
Rogaland politicians